Issac Fenton (30 August 1910 – 1997) was an English professional footballer who made one appearance in the Football League for Hartlepools United as an outside right.

Career statistics

References 

English footballers
Brentford F.C. players
English Football League players
1910 births
1997 deaths
People from Birtley, Tyne and Wear
Footballers from Tyne and Wear
Association football outside forwards
Birtley F.C. players
Burnley F.C. players
Hartlepool United F.C. players